Noel Doherty (5 August 1921 – 23 October 2011) was  a former Australian rules footballer who played with Richmond in the Victorian Football League (VFL).

Notes

External links 		
		
		
		
		
		
		
		
1921 births		
2011 deaths		
Australian rules footballers from Victoria (Australia)
Richmond Football Club players